Gods in the Spirit is a collaborative EP by Los Angeles rapper Blu and Virginia record producer Nottz, released on October 22, 2013 through Coalmine Records.  The six-track record was entirely produced by Nottz and includes guest appearances from Nitty Scott, MC, Aloe Blacc, ANTHM and Homeboy Sandman among others. The lead single, "Boyz II Men," was leaked on October 2, 2013.

Reception

HipHopDX's Dean Mayorga gave the album a three out of five, saying "While it's enjoyable to varying degrees, Gods in the Spirit is a misleading name for a project with little ambitions beyond being a good listen."

Track listing
All tracks were produced by Nottz.

References

2013 EPs
Collaborative albums
Blu (rapper) EPs
Albums produced by Nottz